Jeffery Robert Fenwick (born 1930) was  an eminent Anglican priest in the last quarter of the twentieth century.

History
He was born on 8 April 1930, educated at Pembroke College, Cambridge and ordained in 1956. After a curacy at St Thomas the Martyr, Upholland he became  Priest in charge at Daramombe in what is now Zimbabwe. After incumbencies in  Gatooma and Salisbury East he became Archdeacon of Charter in 1970  and Dean of Bulawayo in 1975. He was a Canon Residentiary at Worcester Cathedral from 1978 until 1985 when he became Dean of Guernsey, a post he held until his retirement six years later.

References

1930 births
Alumni of Pembroke College, Cambridge
Anglican archdeacons in Africa
Church of England deans
Living people